Freedom Party may refer to:

Active political parties
Freedom Party of Afghanistan
Freedom Party of Austria
Bangladesh Freedom Party
Freedom Party of Canada
Freedom Party of Ontario
Freedom Party (Denmark)
Freedom Party (Egypt)
Freedom Egypt Party
Freedom Party (Finland)
Svoboda (political party) ("Freedom"), in Ukraine
Marematlou Freedom Party, in Lesotho
Party for Freedom, in the Netherlands
Inkatha Freedom Party, in South Africa
Sri Lanka Freedom Party
Freedom Party of Switzerland
Freedom Party (Lithuania)
American Freedom Party, in the U.S.
Freedom Party of New York (disambiguation)

Former political parties
Freedom Party (Ecuador) (2001–2003, 2007)
German Freedom Party (2010–2016)
Hungarian Freedom Party (1946–1947)
Freedom Party (Indonesia) (2002–2009)
Freedom Party of South Tyrol, in Italy (1988–1993)
Freedom Party (Bessarabia), in Moldova (1949–1950)
Freedom Party (Netherlands) (PVV) (1946–1948)
Freedom Party (New Zealand) (2005)
Saint Lucia Freedom Party (2001)
Sammarineses for Freedom, in San Marino (2002–2012)
Freedom Party (Slovakia) (1946–1990)
Freedom Party (United Kingdom) (2000–2006)
British Freedom Party, in the UK (2010–2012)
Herut ("Freedom"), in Israel (1948–1988)
Freedom and People's Rights Movement, in Japan, 1880s

Fictional
Freedom Party, in the Southern Victory novels by Harry Turtledove

See also
Freedom and Justice Party (disambiguation)